Leopold II (3 October 1797 – 29 January 1870) was Grand Duke of Tuscany from 1824 to 1859. He married twice; first to Maria Anna of Saxony, and after her death in 1832, to Maria Antonia of the Two-Sicilies. By the latter, he begat his eventual successor, Ferdinand. Leopold was recognised contemporarily as a liberal monarch, authorising the Tuscan Constitution of 1848, and allowing a degree of press freedom.

The Grand Duke was deposed briefly by a provisional government in 1849, only to be restored the same year with the assistance of Austrian troops, who occupied the state until 1855. Leopold attempted a policy of neutrality with regard to the Second Italian War of Independence but was expelled by a bloodless coup on 27 April 1859, just before the beginning of the war. The Grand Ducal family left for Bologna, Papal territory since the Congress of Vienna. Tuscany was occupied by soldiers of Victor Emmanuel II of Sardinia for the duration of the conflict. The preliminary peace of Villafranca, agreed to between Napoleon III of France and Franz Joseph of Austria on 11 July, provided for the return of the Lorraines to Florence, but Leopold himself was considered too unpopular to be accepted, and on 21 July 1859, he abdicated the throne in favour of his son, Ferdinand. Ferdinand was not, however, any more acceptable to the revolutionaries in control of Florence, and his accession was not proclaimed. Instead, the provisional government proclaimed the deposition of the House of Habsburg (16 August).

Biography
Born in Florence, Leopold II was the son of Ferdinand III, Grand Duke of Tuscany and Princess Luisa Maria Amelia Teresa of the Two Sicilies, who were double first cousins. His maternal grandparents were Ferdinand I of the Two Sicilies and Marie Carolina of Austria.

He succeeded his father on 18 June 1824. During the first twenty years of his reign he devoted himself to the internal development of the state. His was the mildest and least reactionary of all the Italian despotisms of the day, and although always subject to Austrian influence he refused to adopt the Austrian methods of government, allowed a fair measure of liberty to the press, and permitted many political exiles from other states to dwell in Tuscany undisturbed.

But when during the early 1840s unrest spread throughout Italy, even in Tuscany demands for a constitution and other political reforms were advanced; in 1845 and 1846, riots occurred in various parts of the country, and Leopold granted a number of administrative reforms. But Austrian influence prevented him from doing more, even had he wished to do so. The election of Pope Pius IX gave fresh encouragement to Liberalism, and on 4 September 1847 Leopold instituted the National Guard – a preparation for a constitution; soon afterward the marchese Cosimo Ridolfi (1794–1865) was appointed prime minister. The granting of the Neapolitan and Piedmontese constitutions was followed (17 February 1848) by that of Tuscany, composed by Gino Capponi.

The uprisings in Milan and in Vienna aroused patriotic enthusiasm in Tuscany, where war against Austria was demanded; Leopold, yielding to popular pressure, sent a force of regulars and volunteers to co-operate with Piedmont in the Lombard campaign. His speech on their departure was uncompromisingly Italian and Liberal. "Soldiers," he said, "the holy cause of Italian freedom is being decided to-day on the fields of Lombardy. Already the citizens of Milan have purchased their liberty with their blood and with a heroism of which history offers few examples... Honour to the arms of Italy! Long live Italian independence!" The Tuscan contingent fought bravely, though unsuccessfully, at Curtatone and Montanara.

On 26 June, the first Tuscan parliament assembled but the disturbances consequent on the failure of the campaign in Lombardy resulted in the resignation of the Ridolfi ministry, which was succeeded by that of Gino Capponi. The riots continued, especially at Livorno, which was prey to actual civil war, and the democratic party of which Francesco Domenico Guerrazzi and Giuseppe Montanelli were organizers became every day more influential. Capponi resigned, and Leopold agreed reluctantly to a Montanelli-Guerrazzi ministry, which in its turn had to fight against the extreme republican party.

New elections in the autumn of 1848 returned a constitutional majority, but it ended by voting in favour of a constituent assembly. There was talk of instituting a central Italian kingdom with Leopold as king, to form part of a larger Italian federation, but in the meanwhile the grand-duke, alarmed at the revolutionary and republican agitations in Tuscany and encouraged by the success of the Austrian troops, was, according to Montanelli, negotiating with Field-Marshal Radetzky and with Pius IX, who had now abandoned his liberal tendencies, and fled to Gaeta. Leopold had left Florence for Siena, and eventually for Porto Santo Stefano, leaving a letter to Guerrazzi in which, on account of a protest from the pope, he declared that he could not agree to the proposed constituent assembly. The utmost confusion prevailed in Florence and other parts of Tuscany.

On 18 February 1849 a republic was proclaimed and on that same day Leopold sailed for Gaeta. A third parliament was elected and Guerrazzi appointed dictator. But there was great discontent, and the defeat of Charles Albert at Novara caused consternation among the Liberals. The majority, while fearing an Austrian invasion, desired the return of the grand-duke who had never been unpopular, and in April 1849 the municipal council usurped the powers of the assembly and invited him to return, "to save us by means of the restoration of the constitutional monarchy surrounded by popular institutions, from the shame and ruin of a foreign invasion." Leopold accepted, although he said nothing about the foreign invasion, and on 1 May sent Count Luigi Serristori to Tuscany with full powers.

But at the same time the Austrians occupied Lucca and Livorno, and although Leopold simulated surprise at their action it has since been proved, as the Austrian general d'Aspre declared at the time, that Austrian intervention was due to the request of the grand-duke. On 24 May the latter appointed G Baldasseroni prime minister, on the 25th the Austrians entered Florence and on 28 July Leopold himself returned. In April 1850 he concluded a treaty with Austria sanctioning the continuation for an indefinite period of the Austrian occupation with 10,000 men; in September he dismissed parliament, and the next year established a concordat with the Church of a very clerical character. He feebly asked Austria if he might maintain the constitution, and the Austrian premier, Prince Felix of Schwarzenberg, advised him to consult the pope, the king of Naples and the dukes of Parma and Modena.

On their advice he formally revoked the constitution (1852). Political trials were held, Guerrazzi and many others being condemned to long terms of imprisonment, and although in 1855 the Austrian troops left Tuscany, Leopold's popularity was gone. Some of the Liberals, however, still believed in the possibility of a constitutional grand-duke who could be induced for a second time to join Piedmont in a war against Austria, whereas the popular party headed by Ferdinando Bartolommei and Giuseppe Dolfi realised that only by the expulsion of Leopold could the national aspirations be realised. When in 1859 France and Piedmont made war on Austria, Leopold's government failed to prevent numbers of young Tuscan volunteers from joining the Franco-Piedmontese forces. Finally an agreement was arrived at between the aristocratic constitutionalists and the popular party, as a result of which the grand-duke's participation in the war was formally demanded.

Leopold at first gave way, and entrusted Don Neri Corsini with the formation of a ministry. The popular demands presented by Corsini were for the abdication of Leopold in favour of his son, an alliance with Piedmont and the reorganisation of Tuscany in accordance with the eventual and definite reorganisation of Italy. Leopold hesitated and finally rejected the proposals as derogatory to his dignity. On 27 April there was great excitement in Florence, Italian colours appeared everywhere, but order was maintained, and the grand-duke and his family departed for Bologna undisturbed. Thus the revolution was accomplished without blood being shed, and after a period of provisional government Tuscany was incorporated in the kingdom of Italy. On 21 July Leopold abdicated in favour of his son Ferdinand IV of Tuscany, who never reigned, but issued a protest from Dresden (26 March 1860).

Evaluation

Leopold of Tuscany was a well-meaning, not unkindly man, and fonder of his subjects than were the other Italian despots, but he was weak, and too closely bound by family ties and Habsburg traditions ever to become a real Liberal. Had he not joined the conclave of autocrats at Gaeta, and, above all, had he not summoned Austrian assistance while denying that he had done so, in 1849, he might yet have preserved his throne, and even changed the course of Italian history. At the same time his rule, if not harsh, was demoralising.

Along with his wife he was the founding patron of L'Istituto Statale della Ss. Annunziata, the first female boarding school in Florence, that would educate aristocratic and noble young ladies. Leopold ordered the construction of La Botte, a water tunnel under the Arno River, which allowed for the final drainage of the Lago di Bientina, which had previously been the largest lake in Tuscany. Completed in 1859, La Botte remains an integral part of the Tuscan water management system.

He spent his last years in Austria, and died in Rome.

Marriages and children

In Dresden on 28 October 1817, and by proxy in Florence on 16 November 1817, Leopold married Princess Maria Anna of Saxony. She was a daughter of Maximilian, Prince of Saxony and Caroline of Bourbon-Parma. Her maternal grandparents were Ferdinand, Duke of Parma and Archduchess Maria Amalia of Austria. Leopold and his wife were second cousins as they were both great-grandchildren of Empress Maria Theresa of Austria. They had four children:

Archduchess Carolina Auguste Elisabeth Vincentia Johanna Josepha (Florence, 19 November 1822 – Florence, 5 October 1841)
Archduchess Auguste Ferdinande of Austria (1 April 1825 – 26 April 1864); married Luitpold, Prince Regent of Bavaria.
Archduchess Maria Maximiliana Thekla Johanna Josepha (Florence, 9 January 1827 – Florence, 18 May 1834)
Archduchess Maria Josepha Amalia Carlotta Giovanna (Florence, 1 May 1828 – Florence, 1 May 1836)

Maria Anna died in Pisa on 24 April 1832. On 7 June 1833, in Naples, Leopold married secondly Maria Antonietta of the Two Sicilies. His new wife was the second daughter of Francis I of the Two Sicilies and Maria Isabella of Spain. Marie Antoinette was his first cousin. They had ten children:

Archduchess Maria Isabella of Austria; married her maternal uncle Prince Francis, Count of Trapani, youngest son of Francis I of the Two Sicilies and Maria Isabella of Spain.
Ferdinand IV, Grand Duke of Tuscany (10 June 1835 – 17 January 1908)
Archduchess Maria Theresia Annunziata Johanna Josepha Paulina Luisa Virginia Apollonia Philomena (Florence, 29 June 1836 – Florence, 5 August 1838)
Archduchess Maria Christina Annunziata Agatha Dorothea Johanna Josephina Luisa Philomena Anna (Florence, 5 February 1838 – Florence, 1 September 1849)
Archduke Karl Salvator of Austria (30 April 1839 – 18 January 1892); married Princess Maria Immaculata of Bourbon-Two Sicilies, second daughter of Ferdinand II of the Two Sicilies and Archduchess Maria Theresa of Austria.
Archduchess Maria Anna Karoline Annunziata Johanna Josepha Gabriela Theresia Katharina Margarethe Philomena (Florence, 9 June 1840 – Florence, 13 August 1841)
Archduke Rainer Salvator Maria Stephan Joseph Johann Philipp Jakob Antonin Zenobius Alois von Gonzaga (Florence, 1 May 1842 – Florence, 14 August 1844)
Archduchess Maria Luisa of Austria (Florence, 31 October 1845 – 27 August 1917); married in Schloss Brandeis, Bohemia, on 31 May 1865 to  Karl, Prince of Isenburg-Büdingen. Her husband was a grandson of Karl, last sovereign Prince of Isenburg. They are the ancestors of Sophie, Princess of Prussia, wife of Georg Friedrich, Prince of Prussia, the head of the House of Hohenzollern.
Archduke Ludwig Salvator of Austria (4 August 1847 – 12 October 1915)
Archduke Johann Salvator of Austria (25 November 1852 – reported lost at sea in 1890); speculation of his survival under an alias (Johann Orth).

Honours 
 : Grand Duchy of Tuscany:
 Grand Master of the Order of St. Joseph
 Grand Master of the Military Order of St. Stephen
 :
 Knight of the Golden Fleece, 1810
 Grand Cross of St. Stephen, 1838
 : Grand Cordon of the Order of Leopold, 1 October 1844
 :
 Knight of St. Januarius
 Grand Cross of St. Ferdinand and Merit
 : Senator Grand Cross of the Constantinian Order of St. George, with Collar, 1851
 : Knight of the Rue Crown, 1817

Ancestry

See also
Unification of Italy

Notes

References

External links

 A listing of his descendants

1797 births
1870 deaths
House of Habsburg
Leopold 2
Austrian princes
Tuscan princes
Burials at the Imperial Crypt
Monarchs who abdicated
Nobility from Florence
People of the Revolutions of 1848
Fellows of the Royal Society
Grand Masters of the Order of Saint Joseph
Knights of the Golden Fleece of Austria
Grand Crosses of the Order of Saint Stephen of Hungary
Royal reburials